Nevius is a surname, and may refer to:

 C. W. Nevius (21st century), American sportswriter
 Craig J. Nevius (21st century), American playwright
 Henry M. Nevius (1841–1911), American soldier, politician and jurist
 Joannes Nevius (circa 1627–1672), American politician
 John Livingstone Nevius (1829-1893), American Protestant missionary in China
 John Nevius (died 1993), American lawyer
 Reuben Nevius (1827-1913), American botanist and Episcopal priest